Frontera is one of the 38 municipalities of Coahuila, in north-eastern Mexico. The municipal seat lies at Ciudad Frontera. The municipality covers an area of 506.8 km².

As of 2005, the municipality had a total population of 70,160.

References

Municipalities of Coahuila